Forchheimer is a German surname that may refer to
Frederick Forchheimer (1853–1913), American pediatrician 
Forchheimer spots seen on the soft palate in some patients with rubella
Philipp Forchheimer (1852–1933), Austrian engineer
Dupuit–Forchheimer assumption on groundwater flow

German-language surnames